Gouraye  is a town and commune in Mauritania, located in the Guidimaka Region.

Climate
In Gouraye, there is a Semi-arid climate with little rainfall. The Köppen-Geiger climate classification is BSh. About  of precipitation falls annually.

Communes of Mauritania